Matt Milne (born 1990) is an English actor and director.

Life and career 
Milne was born in Hereford, in the West-Midlands of England.

In 2010, he filmed Steven Spielberg's War Horse based on the book of the same name by Michael Morpurgo playing a character not in the book: Andrew, a farm hand.

He graduated from the University of East Anglia with a B.A. in 2011.

During Autumn 2011, Milne performed with the National Youth Theatre in James Dacre's reimagining of the ancient legend Orpheus and Eurydice at the Old Vic Tunnels.  He acted in the promenade piece and also played the bass guitar in the band as the actors took turns to play the score written by Nick Cave and the Bad Seeds.

As War Horse was released during late 2011 and early 2012, Milne joined ITV period drama Downton Abbey as the character of Alfred, a footman. He made his first appearance on Downton Abbey on the first episode of Season 3 and continued to appear until the finale episode of Season 4 in 2013.  He travelled to the Bronx to film the Chuck MacLean short film Marmalade for Cameron Lawther in between.

Milne was part of the Jon Brittain play Margaret Thatcher: Queen of Soho during 2014, and the Michael Attenborough directed play Dangerous Corner. Milne directed the documentary What's the craic?! The International Dublin Gay Theatre Festival with Dublin-based filmmaking collective Kino-Dublin, or 'KinoD'.

Filmography

Film

Television

References

External links

1990 births
Living people
Alumni of the University of East Anglia
British actors
People from Hereford